Ornithoptera is a genus of birdwing butterflies found in the northern portion of the Australasian realm, east of Weber's line; the Moluccas, New Guinea, the Solomon Islands, and northeastern Australia; except for Ornithoptera richmondia, which may be found in far northeastern New South Wales, Australia, therefore the southernmost distribution of birdwings. This genus includes the two largest butterfly species in the world, the Queen Alexandra's birdwing and the Goliath birdwing. Ornithoptera species are highly prized by insect collectors because they are rare, large, and considered exceptionally beautiful.

Species
 subgenus: Aetheoptera
 Ornithoptera victoriae – Queen Victoria's birdwing
 subgenus: Ornithoptera
 Ornithoptera aesacus – Obi Island birdwing
 Ornithoptera croesus – Wallace's golden birdwing
 Ornithoptera euphorion – Cairns birdwing
 Ornithoptera priamus – common green birdwing
 Ornithoptera richmondia – Richmond birdwing
 subgenus: Schoenbergia
 Ornithoptera chimaera – chimaera birdwing
 Ornithoptera goliath – Goliath birdwing
 Ornithoptera meridionalis – southern tailed birdwing
 Ornithoptera paradisea – paradise birdwing
 Ornithoptera rothschildi – Rothschild's birdwing
 Ornithoptera tithonus – Tithonus birdwing
 subgenus: Straatmana
 Ornithoptera alexandrae – Queen Alexandra's birdwing

References

Butterfly genera
Papilionidae
Taxa named by Jean Baptiste Boisduval